Peabody's New Hampshire State Regiment was raised on January 1, 1778 under Col. Stephen Peabody at Hampstead, New Hampshire for service with Gen. John Sullivan in Rhode Island. The term of enlistment was one year. The regiment marched to Newport, Rhode Island and took part in the Battle of Rhode Island on August 29, 1778. The regiment was disbanded on January 1, 1779 at the end of the men's enlistments.

References

External links
Bibliography of the Continental Army in New Hampshire compiled by the United States Army Center of Military History

Military units and formations established in 1778
Peabody's New Hampshire State Regiment
1778 establishments in New Hampshire